Variable frame rate (or VFR) is a term in video compression for a feature supported by some container formats which allows for the frame rate to change actively during video playback, or to drop the idea of frame rate completely and set an individual timecode for each frame. VFR is especially useful for creating videos of slideshow presentations or when the video contains large amounts of completely static frames, as a means of improving compression rate, or if the video contains a combination of 24/25/30/50/60 FPS footages and the creator or editor of the video wishes to avoid artifacts arising from framerate-conversion.

In video recording, a lowered framerate may be preferred in darker environments to extend the exposure time per frame, allowing the image sensor to capture more light, which results in brighter footage.

References

See also 
 Comparison of container formats

Film and video technology